Hewitsonia kirbyi, the Kirby's tiger blue, is a butterfly in the family Lycaenidae. It is found in Nigeria, Cameroon, Gabon, the Republic of the Congo, Angola, the Democratic Republic of the Congo and Zambia. The habitat consists of forests.

The larvae feed on lichen on the bark of trees.

Subspecies
Hewitsonia kirbyi kirbyi (Nigeria: south and the Cross River loop, Cameroon, Gabon, Congo, Angola, Democratic Republic of the Congo: east of Lualaba, Zambia)
Hewitsonia kirbyi preussi Staudinger, 1891 (eastern Democratic Republic of the Congo)

Etymology
The name honours two entomologists William Chapman Hewitson and William Forsell Kirby.

References

Butterflies described in 1879
Poritiinae
Butterflies of Africa
Taxa named by Hermann Dewitz